This is the list of awards and nominations received by Taiwanese singer Jay Chou.

Golden Horse Awards
The Golden Horse Awards are presented annually by the Government Information Office of Republic of China (Taiwan). It recognises achievement in filmmaking and is Taiwan's equivalent to Academy Awards and BAFTA.

Golden Melody Awards
The Golden Melody Awards are presented annually by the Government Information Office of Republic of China (Taiwan). It recognises achievement in music production and is Taiwan's equivalent to the Grammy Awards. Since his debut in 2000, he has received 15 awards from 49 nominations.

Hong Kong Film Awards
The Hong Kong Film Awards, founded in 1982 and presented annually in April, recognizes achievement in filmmaking and is Hong Kong's equivalent to Academy Awards and BAFTA.

MTV Movie & TV Awards 
The MTV Movie & TV Awards (formerly known as the MTV Movie Awards) is a film and television awards show presented annually on MTV.

World Music Awards
The World Music Awards is an international awards show founded in 1989 that annually honors recording artists based on worldwide sales figures provided by the International Federation of the Phonographic Industry (IFPI).

MTV Video Music Awards Japan 
MTV VMAJ was started in 2002.

References 

Awards
Chou, Jay
Lists of awards received by Mandopop artist